Jordi Amat Maas (born 21 March 1992) is a professional footballer who plays as a centre-back for Malaysia Super League club Johor Darul Ta'zim and the Indonesia national team.

He spent the better part of his career with Espanyol and Swansea City, also representing Rayo Vallecano (two spells) and Betis in La Liga.

Amat played for Spain at youth level and Indonesia as a senior, making his debut for the latter in 2022.

Club career

Espanyol
Born in Canet de Mar, Barcelona, Catalonia, Amat joined Espanyol's youth system at the age of only seven. He began appearing as a senior with the B team, in the Segunda División B.

On 24 January 2010, two months shy of his 18th birthday, Amat played his first La Liga match with the club, coming on as a late substitute in a 1–1 home draw against RCD Mallorca. He finished his first full season with 26 appearances (28 in all competitions), helping the Pericos to a final eighth position.

Amat was loaned to fellow top-tier Rayo Vallecano for 2012–13, being first choice during the campaign. He scored his first goal for the Madrid outskirts side on 24 February 2013, netting from 50 metres in an eventual 1–2 home loss to Real Valladolid and also putting one in his own net in the same match.

Swansea City
On 27 June 2013, Premier League club Swansea City announced Amat had been signed for a transfer fee of £2.5 million on a four-year deal; it was subject to international clearance and a medical. He made his official debut on 1 August, playing the full 90 minutes in a 4–0 home victory over Malmö FF in the first leg of the third qualifying round of the UEFA Europa League.

Amat agreed to a one-year contract extension on 11 March 2015, keeping him at the Liberty Stadium until 2018. On 7 July 2017, he was loaned to Real Betis for one season.

Return to Rayo
On 9 August 2018, Amat returned to both Rayo Vallecano and the Spanish top flight, signing for an undisclosed fee. He played his first match in his second spell ten days later, featuring the entire 1–4 home defeat against Sevilla FC.

On 1 August 2019, after Rayo's relegation, Amat joined K.A.S. Eupen of the Belgian First Division A on a one-year loan, with an obligation to buy at the end of the season.

Johor Darul Ta'zim
On 29 June 2022, Amat joined Johor Darul Ta'zim F.C. of the Malaysia Super League. He made his debut on 19 August, in a 5–0 loss to Urawa Red Diamonds in the round of 16 of the AFC Champions League. 

Amat played the full 90 minutes in three of Johor's 2022 Malaysia Cup matches, a 2–0 win against Petaling Jaya City FC in the round of 16's second leg, the 5–0 victory over Kelantan F.C. in the quarter-finals as well as the decisive match, a 3–1 defeat of Sabah FC. On 2 February 2023, he captained his team for the first time, in a friendly against Russian Premier League club FC Lokomotiv Moscow.

International career

Spain
Amat made his competitive debut for the Spanish under-17s in 2009. He also represented the nation at under-18, under-19, under-20 and under-21 levels.

Indonesia
In November 2022, Amat was called up by the Indonesia national team for a training camp in preparation for the 2022 AFF Championship. Selected for the final squad, he won his first cap on 23 December in a 2–1 win over Cambodia in the group stage; as his side operated in a 4–3–3 formation, he was their only player to be included in the tournament's All-Star XI, playing four complete matches and missing one due to yellow cards.

Personal life
He was officially welcomed as part of the Nusantara Sultanate Royal Council on 1 July 2022, being awarded the title of Pangeran (prince).

Amat obtained Indonesian citizenship through naturalisation in November 2022.

Career statistics

Club

International

Honours
Johor Darul Ta'zim
Malaysia FA Cup: 2022
Malaysia Cup: 2022
Piala Sumbangsih: 2023

Spain U17
FIFA U-17 World Cup third place: 2009

Individual
AFF Championship All-Star XI: 2022

References

External links

1992 births
Living people
People from Canet de Mar
Indo people
Spanish people of Indonesian descent
Indonesian people of Spanish descent
Naturalised citizens of Indonesia
Sportspeople of Indonesian descent
Sportspeople from the Province of Barcelona
Spanish footballers
Indonesian footballers
Footballers from Catalonia
Association football defenders
La Liga players
Segunda División B players
RCD Espanyol B footballers
RCD Espanyol footballers
Rayo Vallecano players
Real Betis players
Premier League players
Swansea City A.F.C. players
Belgian Pro League players
K.A.S. Eupen players
Malaysia Super League players
Johor Darul Ta'zim F.C. players
Spain youth international footballers
Spain under-21 international footballers
Indonesia international footballers
Catalonia international footballers
Spanish expatriate footballers
Indonesian expatriate footballers
Expatriate footballers in Wales
Expatriate footballers in Belgium
Expatriate footballers in Malaysia
Spanish expatriate sportspeople in Wales
Spanish expatriate sportspeople in Belgium
Spanish expatriate sportspeople in Malaysia